Zakharov Books (Russian: Издательство Захаров) is one of the main Russian independent publishing houses.

Founded by the journalist Igor Zakharov in 1998 as a small independent publishing company, they gradually developed into an important publisher of popular and literary fiction. At the very beginning of their existence as an independent publishing, they discovered Boris Akunin, and they still hold the rights to his best-selling books about Inspector Fandorin that have been translated into most European languages. More than seven million copies of these books were sold in Russia alone. Among their other authors they list such writers as Vladimir Sorokin, Venedikt Erofeyev, Sergey Gandlevsky, Vera Pavlova and Anatoly Kudryavitsky. Zakharov Books are also prominent as publishers of translated fiction, memoirs and biographies (more than four hundred titles appeared over the last ten years).

References

External links
 Official site (Russian)

Book publishing companies of Russia
Companies based in Moscow